Takashi Hirata (born 15 January 1936) is a Japanese wrestler. He competed in the men's Greco-Roman flyweight at the 1960 Summer Olympics.

References

External links
 

1936 births
Living people
Japanese male sport wrestlers
Olympic wrestlers of Japan
Wrestlers at the 1960 Summer Olympics
Sportspeople from Tokyo
20th-century Japanese people